The Diplôme d'Études Supérieur Appliqué (DESA), in which the final word is also variously Approfondies or Avancée, is an advanced educational degree that was awarded in France and other Francophone countries. It was an intermediate degree between the Licence awarded after university study, and the advanced degree of Doctorat.

References
 Diplôme d’ingénieur spécialisé/Diplôme d'études supérieures appliquées
 Qu'est-ce qu'un DEA, un DESS ou un DOCTORAT ??

See also
DEA
Licence
Doctorat

Master's degrees
Education in France

fr:Diplôme d'études supérieures appliquées